Bridges is a studio album by American country artist Lynn Anderson. It was released on June 9, 2015, via Center Sound Productions and was produced by Bill VornDick. Bridges was Anderson's 37th studio recording of her career and her first album of gospel music. The album contained a variety of new and older gospel tracks. It was released a month prior to her death, making Bridges the final studio release in Anderson's career. The album also contained one single release.

Background
Bridges was created from the failure of another album project. Anderson had recorded several gospel tracks for an independent label, but the album's manager got fired. Instead, her producer bought the tracks and helped her finish the album. "You never know where your next deal might come from," Anderson said in 2015. Bridges was produced by Bill VornDick, who had previously produced her 2004 album, The Bluegrass Sessions. Anderson stated in 2015 that she enjoyed working with VornDick on the project, praising his mixing capabilities. Anderson also enlisted her daughter, Lisa Sutton, to create the artwork for the project.

Content
Bridges featured a collection of 12 country gospel tracks. One song, "Drift Away Gospel", was penned by Anderson's domestic partner Mentor Williams. The song was a gospel reworking of the original track first recorded in the 1970s. "He rewrote it for our little church in Taos, New Mexico. We’d been singing it in church for a couple of years. The congregation loves it, and I hope our audience loves it," Anderson reflected. The album's eighth track, "My Guardian Angel," was penned by her mother Liz Anderson. Although her mother had died prior to the album, Anderson stated she enjoyed putting her mother's compositions into her record projects. The album also features vocal harmonies from groups The Oak Ridge Boys and The Martins. Also included is the track, "Heaven Has a Human Touch," which was co-written by singer-songwriter Mike Reid. Anderson recounted her appreciation for Reid's writing: "It’s a great song that was written by Mike Reid, who is one of my favorite songwriters in Nashville. He’s written so many big hits."

Release and reception

Prior to the release of the album, "Drift Away Gospel" was released as the first single in May 2015. The album was officially released on June 9, 2015, via Center Sound Productions. It was Anderson's first project in five years and 37th studio project in her career. One month later, on July 31, 2015, Anderson died from complications of pneumonia. Ultimately, Bridges became Anderson's final album release in her career.

The album was reviewed positively by Hallels writer Timothy Yap. "Bridges finds Anderson abandoning her popish appeal in favour of a more sympathetically country backing which brings out a warmer (and more plaintive) feel of the songs," he commented. Markos Papadatos of Digital Journal also gave the record a positive response, calling the project "phenomenal." He highlighted tracks such as "Drift Away," "Sky Full of Angels," and "Wanderer's Prayer." Overall, he gave the project 4.5 out of 5 stars. "Overall, Lynn Anderson is amazing on her latest studio album, Bridges. She is one artist that never disappoints on any album or single that she records and releases. This project deserves a Grammy nomination to the very least, and the folks at the Country Music Hall of Fame and Museum ought to take notice."

Track listing

Personnel
All credits are adapted from Allmusic.

Musical personnel

 Lynn Anderson – lead vocals
 Chip Davis – background vocals
 Bruce Dees – background vocals, electric guitar
 Mark Fain – bass
 Sonny Garrish – steel dobro
 Steve Gibson – electric guitar
 Pete Huttlinger – acoustic guitar
 The Martins – guest artist
 The Oak Ridge Boys – guest artist
 Bobby Ogdin – Hammond b3 organ
 Angela Primm – background vocals
 Jason Roller – fiddle, mandolin
 Amaleia Rubble – background vocals
 Lisa Silver – background vocals
 Milton Smith – strings
 Cindy Richardson Walker – background vocals
 Lynn Williams – drums
 Reggie Young – electric guitar

Technical personnel
 Eric Darken – percussion
 Chip Davis – engineering
 Bruce Dees – engineering
 Ron Fairchild – engineering
 Michelle Rahmani – production coordination
 Lisa Sutton – art direction, photography
 Bill VornDick – engineering, producer

Release history

References

2015 albums
Gospel albums by American artists
Lynn Anderson albums